Frédéric Bégin (born November 10, 1975, in Trois-Pistoles, Quebec) is a Canadian score composer.  Bégin received two Gémeaux Awards both at the 24th ceremony and both for the Canadian television series two of Les Étoiles filantes (The Shooting Stars).

Early life and education
Bégin graduated with a degree in music from the Université de Montréal.

Filmography

Feature length
 2005: Dodging the Clock (Horloge biologique)
 2007: Bluff
 2009: 1981
 2010: Y'en aura pas de facile
 2011: The Happiness of Others (Le Bonheur des autres)
 2014: 1987
 2015: Aurélie Laflamme - Les pieds sur terre
 2015: The Mirage (Le Mirage)
 2017: Threesome (Le Trip à trois)
 2018: 1991
 2020: The Guide to the Perfect Family (Le Guide de la famille parfaite)

Shorts
 2004 : Nourri au Grain
 2009 : Le Technicien
 2016 : Introduction to Virtual Reality
 2016 : Through the Ages: President Obama Celebrates America's National Parks
 2017 : The People's House – Inside the White House with Barack and Michelle Obama 
 2019 : Mercy

Television
 2004: Smash
 2005: Smash 2
 2006: 3X Rien (2006)
 2006: Les Étoiles filantes (2006)
 2007: Les Étoiles filantes 2
 2007: Nos étés
 2010: Malenfant
 2010: En audition avec Simon
 2012: Roxy
 2014: Ces gars-là
 2014: Le Berceau des anges (2015)
 2020: La Maison-Bleue
 2020: Les Mecs

Awards and nominations

Awards
 2015 : Gemeaux Awards : Best music for a dramatic series for Le Berceau des Anges )
 2009 : Gemeaux Awards : Best music for a dramatic series for Les Étoiles filantes 2 )
 2009 : Gemeaux Awards : Best musical theme for Les Étoiles filantes 2 )

Nominations
2004 : Best Music for Smash at Gemeaux Awards
2004 : Best musical Theme Smash at Gemeaux Awards
2006 : Best music Horloge biologique at Jutras Awards
2007 : Best musical theme Les Étoiles filantes at Gemeaux Awards
2007 : Best music Nos étés at Gemeaux Awards
2015 : Best music Le Berceau des Anges at Gemeaux Awards
2015 : Best musical theme Le Berceau des Anges at Gemeaux Awards
2019 : Best music 1991 at Gala Québec Cinéma

References

External links
 
 

1975 births
Living people
People from Trois-Pistoles, Quebec
Canadian film score composers
Male film score composers
Musicians from Quebec